Henrietta Wilfrida "Frida" Leakey (née Avern; 1902 – 19 August 1993), also known as H. Wilfrida Leakey, was a British teacher who discovered a gorge that was named FLK or "Frida Leakey Korongo". The gorge was the site of ancient stone tools and important human fossil discoveries. Leakey was the first wife of paleoanthropologist and archaeologist Louis Leakey. She became a leader in the Women's Institute and a County Councillor.

Life
She was born in 1902 and her father, Henry Averne, sold cork in Reigate in Surrey. She attended the Sorbonne before going on to Newnham College in Cambridge. She then went to Kent where she worked teaching French at Benenden School.

She married Louis Leakey and their first child was a daughter Priscilla Muthoni Leakey.

She learnt how to construct archaeological illustrations and it is her illustrations that are included in "The Stone Age Cultures of Kenya Colony" published by her husband in 1931. The book describes excavations in 1926–7 and 1928–9.

She discovered a gorge off Olduvai gorge that was named "FLK" for "Frida Leakey Korongo". This gorge would be an outstanding source of human fossils.

Her husband's behaviour was criticised by family and friends when he left her just after the birth of their son Colin in December 1933. In 1936, she divorced him for his infidelity and he quickly married Mary Leakey. Frida, her son, and her daughter went to live in Cambridge. Colin did not see his father again until he was 19.

During the war she organised billeting at Girton College. She was elected chair of the Women's Institute in Cambridgeshire and she was elected as an independent County Councillor for Cambridgeshire.

Death and legacy
She died in 1993 leaving two children. The gorge that she had discovered, Frida Leakey Korongo (and was named for her) was found to be the location of ancient hominids (homo erectus) living 1.5 million years ago. They were using stone tools and their diet included the hippopotamus. Excavations were still in progress in 2019.

References

1902 births
1993 deaths
British educators
British explorers
British women educators
Women councillors in England
Councillors in Cambridgeshire